The Central North Correctional Centre formerly known as "The Superjail" is a maximum security prison located in Penetanguishene, Ontario, Canada. During its period of private management from 2001 to 2006, it was the only privately-run adult correctional facility in Canada.

History 

The Central North Correctional Centre was commissioned in November 2001 to replace the outdated Barrie Jail, Parry Sound Jail, and Guelph Correctional Centre. It opened as the first privately-operated correctional facility in Canada. Management and Training Corporation Canada (MTCC), a subsidiary of the Centerville, Utah-based private prison firm Management and Training Corporation, was contracted by the provincial Ministry of Community Safety and Correctional Services to operate the facility for a five year pilot project. Following the completion of the five-year term, the contract between the Ontario Government and MTCC. was not renewed. The operation of the facility was turned over to the government on November 10, 2006.

See also 

List of correctional facilities in Ontario

References 

Buildings and structures in Simcoe County
Prisons in Ontario
2001 establishments in Ontario
Management and Training Corporation
Private prisons